The Northwest Passage was a bi-weekly underground newspaper in Bellingham, Washington, which was published from March 17, 1969 to June 1986. The paper was co-founded by Frank Kathman as publisher, Laurence Kee as Managing Editor, and Michael Carlson (now Harman) as Art Director. The newspaper was primarily known for its graphic design content.

Publication history 
Frank Kathman had originally been influenced by a college class that he took with Bernard Weiner at Western Washington State College (now University), where the underground press was studied. Later, Kathman and Carlson wrote and designed a recruitment poster that was printed, calling for the founding of the paper. They recruited Kee, who was a reporter for the Bellingham Herald, and the only one of the three with a steady paycheck, so it came down to him to write a check to the Lynden Tribune on March 17, 1969, in order to get the first issue printed. Kee was later fired from the conservative Herald for his involvement with the Passage.

The paper was sustained from that point on by personal donations from the community; by sales in a few news boxes and through personal hawking campaigns in Bellingham and Seattle; through subscriptions sold to individuals and university and community libraries all over the country; and through the sale of display advertising — most notably through a deal with Warner Bros. Records. The Tribune later refused to print the Passage, bending to conservative political pressures in the county, and the Passage was moved to the Skagit Valley Herald for further printing. Published in tabloid newspaper format and selling for 25 cents, it was a member of the Underground Press Syndicate and the Liberation News Service, and reported circulation of 6000 copies in 1972. Volunteers set type and did layout.

The Northwest Passage was originally housed in Kee's home on Maplewood Ave, where the bedrooms were converted to graphics layout rooms. Later, when Kee and the paper were evicted from the rented house, the Passage moved to a house in the outlying area, on Yew Street Rd. The next home of the paper was in a taxidermy building on W. Holly St., near the downtown area. Later, the paper moved to offices in the Morgan Block Building in the Fairhaven District of Bellingham, known as "Happy Valley", or the "Southside". "Happy Valley" had been a common name for the area since before the founding of Fairhaven. The Block building, located at 1000 Harris Avenue was owned by the People's Land Trust. It also housed Good Earth Pottery, Fairhaven Music, and the Community Food Co-op, and was a hive of the counterculture from 1969 through the end of the Vietnam War. At the time, Fairhaven was a hippie enclave—a temporary autonomous zone of cooperative enterprise that spawned the community garden program, a cooperative primary school, and a co-op flour mill (it has since become a family-owned business and moved out of Bellingham), all of which are still thriving forty years later.

Though initially a kind of hippie paper focusing on the counterculture and ending the Vietnam War, under the leadership of Kathman and Kee, and later Chris Condon and others, it quickly became an important source of investigative journalism on political and environmental issues in Bellingham and the Pacific Northwest in general. 

During the People's Park riots in Berkeley, California during the summer of 1969, the Passage was chosen as the pool print representative for the national media, and was allowed inside the Park to be "embedded" with the armed National Guard unit that was holding the Park against the siege conducted by thousands of demonstrators who were trying to get the park restored to its former use as a public area. The resulting article by Kee was representative of other reporting by the Passage which was often quoted by other publications and even reprinted by some on occasion. Although the editorial and reporting reach of the Passage extended out into the nation and the world, the paper nevertheless retained its local community feeling in Bellingham throughout its existence.

Original editor Laurence Kee left the paper to found the Seattle rock band Child, and in Los Angeles played with the Eric Burdon Band and others, before coming back to Bellingham to teach at Western Washington University's Fairhaven College in their "Artist-In-Residence" program.

From 1969 to 1977 Northwest Passage was based in Bellingham, relocating in 1977 to Seattle.  In Seattle it was produced at 1017 E. Pike Street. After 1981 it was published monthly.

Five articles from Northwest Passage were selected for the book Alternative Papers: Selections from the Alternative Press, 1979 - 1980.

A 1990 Northwest Passage Reunion brought out reflections by Bernard Weiner.

Contributors 
 Mary Kay Becker, later a state legislator and a judge on the Washington State Court of Appeals
 Bob Hicks, who had a long newspaper career as an editor with the Portland Oregonian and later as an online reviewer
 Roxanne Park, who became a leader with the Prison Sentencing Commission for the State of Washington
 Bernard Weiner, who became a critic/editor with the San Francisco Chronicle for nearly two decades and co-founded the political-analysis website The Crisis Papers
 Buck Meloy, who became a leader in the fishing community in Alaska and along the Pacific Coast
 Cindy Green (Davis), illustrator of the popular Molasses Jug centerfold (created by Shiela Gilda and Elizabeth Mabe), went on to a successful career as a graphic artist
 Jerome (Jerry)Richard)& Carolyn (Griff) Richard.  Jerry taught English at Fairhaven College.  He went on to write books including KISS OF THE PRISON DANCER and THE ARCHITECT.  Griff went on to teach English & then joined a Seattle law firm as a paralegal.
 David Wolf, who moved on to various leadership roles with the City of Bellingham and Whatcom County
 John Servais, who founded and edits the website NorthwestCitizen
 Melissa Queen, who became a noted yoga teacher/board member at the Mount Madonna Center in California
 Joel Connelly, who became the politics writer for the Seattle Post-Intelligencer newspaper
 Marga Rosencranz (Rose Hancock), who became executive director of the American Institute of Architects–Seattle
 Jeff (Yehuda) Fine, who while with the paper wrote the columns on Wild Pacific Northwest Herbs and later went on to found and become the principal of one of the earliest alternative high schools for the Mendocino Unified School District in California — The Community School, and then moved to Brooklyn where he was ordained as a rabbi, became head guidance counselor for Yeshiva University in NYC and later a noted author of the bestselling recovery book, Times Square Rabbi — Finding the Hope in Lost Kids' Lives (Hazelden, UP Publishing) and The Real Deal — For Parents' Only: The Top 75 Questions Teens Want Answered Today as well as his first novel Shadow Walker (Simon & Schuster) on the rise of sex trafficking in America.
 Barbara Sjoholm (writing under her pen name, Barbara Wilson), an American, writer, editor, publisher and translator. Co-founder of Seal Press.

See also
 List of underground newspapers of the 1960s counterculture

References

External links 
  Northwest Passage on FairhavenHistory.com

Alternative press
Biweekly newspapers published in the United States
Publications established in 1969
Publications disestablished in 1986